Devonport-Takapuna is a local government area in Auckland, in New Zealand's Auckland Region, governed by the Devonport-Takapuna Local Board and Auckland Council. It currently aligns with the council's North Shore Ward.

Geography

The local board area includes the major suburbs of Devonport and Takapuna. It also includes the smaller suburbs of Castor Bay, Crown Hill, Forrest Hill, Milford, Westlake, Lake Pupuke, Belmont, Narrow Neck, Stanley Bay, Bayswater and Shoal Bay.

The area extends from Sunnynook and Castor Bay in the north, to Stanley Bay and Devonport in the south, to State Highway 1. It features Mt Victoria, North Head, and the large volcanic crater of Lake Pupuke.

Features

There are several beaches in the area.

The Bruce Mason Centre, The PumpHouse Theatre, Rose Centre, Depot Artspace and Michael King Writers’ Centre are also located in the area.

References